None Too Fragile Theatre  is a regional theater based in Akron, OH.  Established in 2010 in Cuyahoga Falls, Ohio, the theatre moved to its current location in Pub Bricco in 2012.

The Co-Founders and Co-Artistic Directors are Sean Derry and Alanna Romansky. Jaysen Mercer is Co-Founder and Managing Director.

The black box theater specializes in "cutting-edge fare that challenges conventional thinking."

Current season's productions
2014 Season 
Love Drunk, Romulus Linney, February 28 - March 15, 2014
Gideon's Knot, Johnna Adams, April 4–19, 2014 
Possum Dreams, Edward Falco, June 13–28, 2014
Ride, Eric Lane, August 15–30, 2014
The Sunset Limited, Cormac McCarthy, September 12–27, 2014
In a Forest, Dark and Deep, Neil LaBute, October 10–25, 2014
Top Dog Under Dog, Suzan-Lori Parks, November 14–29, 2014
Exact Change, Christine Howey (also stars), December 12–13, 2014

See also
 Professional Theatre

References

External links
None Too Fragile official website

Regional theatre in the United States